Upstairs is a 1919 American silent comedy film directed by Victor Schertzinger and starring Mabel Normand, Cullen Landis, and Hallam Cooley.

Cast
 Mabel Normand as Elsie MacFarland 
 Cullen Landis as Lemuel Stallings 
 Hallam Cooley as Harrison Perry 
 Edwin Stevens as Detective Murphy 
 Robert Bolder as Chef Henri 
 Charles A. Post as Assistant Chef 
 Colin Kenny as George 
 Beatrice Burnham as Eloise Barrison 
 Frederick Vroom as James Barrison 
 Kate Lester as Mrs. Barrison

References

Bibliography
 James Robert Parish & Michael R. Pitts. Film directors: a guide to their American films. Scarecrow Press, 1974.

External links

1919 films
1919 comedy films
1910s English-language films
American silent feature films
Silent American comedy films
Films directed by Victor Schertzinger
American black-and-white films
Goldwyn Pictures films
1910s American films